Tony Krajewski Thurmond (born August 21, 1968) is an American politician and educator who is the 28th and current California State Superintendent of Public Instruction. Thurmond was narrowly elected Superintendent of Public Instruction in 2018 over his opponent, Marshall Tuck. He was the endorsed candidate of the California Democratic Party and all five 2018 California Teachers of the Year. A Democrat, he represented the 15th Assembly district from 2014 to 2018, encompassing the northern East Bay.

Thurmond was a member of the California Legislative Latino Caucus, California Legislative Black Caucus, and California Legislative Jewish Caucus. Prior to being elected to the Assembly in 2014, he was a member of the Richmond City Council, a board member of the West Contra Costa Unified School District, and social services administrator.

Thurmond is the second African American to hold the office of Superintendent, and the fourth African American to win statewide office in California following Superintendent Wilson Riles, Lieutenant Governor Mervyn Dymally, and Attorney General Kamala Harris.

Early career 
Thurmond has held positions with several nonprofit social service organizations.  In the mid-2000s, Thurmond was the executive director of Beyond Emancipation, a social service agency providing aftercare services to youths leaving the child welfare and juvenile justice systems in Alameda County.  At the Golden Gate Regional Center, he was a program manager leading service provision to individuals with developmental disabilities. In 2012 he began to serve as the Senior Director of Community and Government Relations at Lincoln Child Center.  Much of his social service work has focused on improving service provision to current and former foster youth and directing educational programs that provided job training to at-risk youth in the East Bay area.

Political career 
Before being elected to the California State Assembly in 2014, Thurmond was a member of the West Contra Costa School Board from 2008 to 2012 and the Richmond City Council from 2005 to 2008. Thurmond was the council liaison to the West Contra Costa County Unified School District and the West Contra Costa County Education Fund. He also served as council liaison to Richmond's Youth Commission and Workforce Investment Board.

Since 2004, Thurmond has pursued seven different elected offices: he ran unsuccessfully for Richmond City Council in 2004, was elected to the Richmond City Council in 2006, lost an election for State Assembly in 2008, won an election to the West Contra Costa School Board in 2008, created an exploratory committee for a potential State Senate campaign in 2009, was elected to the State Assembly in 2014, was re-elected to the State Assembly in 2016, and announced his campaign for State Superintendent in 2017.

Legislative record 

Thurmond's first bill to be signed into law was AB 1375, which increases the rate of credit for time served incarcerated in lieu of paying court fines. This credit had not been adjusted since its inception in 1976; this bill adjusts it for inflation and the minimum wage. Thurmond's AB 1496 requires the California Air Resources Board to measure and reduce methane emissions to help curb greenhouse gas emissions statewide. AB 1343 helps ensure due process for defendants who are immigrants; it was part of a package of legislation focused on protecting undocumented immigrants. AB 768 bans use or possession of smokeless tobacco products in California's five professional baseball stadiums. AB 2X-9, the Tobacco-Free Schools Act, co-authored by Thurmond and Assemblymember Adrin Nazarian, bans tobacco use on all school district-owned or school-leased property. This bill also mandates that schools post signs reading "tobacco use is prohibited" at entrances.

Thurmond's legislation AB 435 was the first piece of legislation sponsored by the First 5 Contra Costa Children and Families Commission.  The bill was signed by Governor Brown and provides more subsidies to early childcare services for low-income families in multiple California counties.  Thurmond's legislation AB 1014 moved $35 million from the California prison system directly to local school districts to invest in programs to reduce truancy. Another bill of Thurmond's, AB 1502, reduced paperwork to provide free and reduced lunch to more eligible California students. Previously, only 63% of eligible students were matched to the free and reduced lunch program.

As Chair of the Budget Subcommittee #1 on Health and Human Services, Thurmond helped secure resources in the California State Budget for county welfare offices for Medi-Cal eligibility administration, caregiver resource centers, medical clinics to extend urgent care hours, an HIV prevention outreach program, syringe exchange programs and mental health advocacy especially for veterans, youth and racial and ethnic minorities.

On September 15, 2017, Thurmond introduced a resolution in the California State Assembly calling for the Congressional censure of President Donald Trump following his remarks after racially charged events in Charlottesville.

Tony Thurmond received a score of 100% on both the Equality California and California League of Conservation Voters legislative score cards for 2016.

State Assembly committees
For 2015–2016, Thurmond was a member of the following committees:
 Labor and Employment Committee, Chair 
 Education Committee
 Health Committee
 Human Services Committee

Select committees

 Science, Technology, Engineering, and Mathematics Education, Chair
 Status of Boys and Men of Color
 Technical Education and Building a 21st Century Workforce

2014 California State Assembly

2016 California State Assembly

State Superintendent

On April 3, 2017, Thurmond launched his campaign for State Superintendent, choosing not to run for re-election for his seat in the State Assembly. His campaign was supported by California's teachers' unions. He won the November 2018 election, beating opponent Marshall Tuck, a Democrat and charter school advocate.

On December 11, 2021, Politico reported that Thurmond had been instrumental in the July 2020 hiring of longtime associate Daniel Lee, "a psychologist, life coach and self-help author", for the position of "superintendent of equity" for the California Department of Education (CDE). Politico reported that the hiring of Lee, a Philadelphia resident up to when the report was published, appeared to violate California's residency requirement for state employees, which allows for few exceptions. The position was never posted publicly, having been initially funded by part of a $700,000 grant by the Hewlett Foundation through the CDE's nonprofit affiliate "Californians Dedicated to Education Foundation" before being funded by California taxpayers, and paid up to a $179,832 salary; the report said Lee's resume showed no prior experience in California or relationships with school districts in the state. On December 14, 2021, Lee resigned from the position.

Personal life
Thurmond lives in Richmond, California.  He has two daughters.

References

External links 

 Government website
 Campaign website

21st-century American politicians
1968 births
African-American state legislators in California
20th-century American Jews
American people of Panamanian descent
American politicians of Panamanian descent
Bryn Mawr College alumni
California Superintendents of Public Instruction
Hispanic and Latino American politicians
Living people
Democratic Party members of the California State Assembly
Richmond City Council members (California)
School board members in California
Temple University alumni
21st-century African-American politicians
21st-century American Jews
20th-century African-American people